The Cleveland Giants were a Negro league baseball team. The team played for one year, 1933. Their home games were contested at Cleveland's Luna Bowl in Luna Park.

History 
In 1933, the struggling Columbus Blue Birds of the Negro National League dropped out and were replaced by the Cleveland Giants. Overall, the club went 22-28 and did not continue after the year. Bingo DeMoss managed the team, which included Bill Byrd (5-6), Wilson Redus (.325), SS Leroy Morney (.467) and OF Jabbo Andrews. Andrews was third in the NNL with 13 homers and third with a .412 average. Morney split the year with the Baltimore Black Sox and led the circuit in batting average.

References

External links

African-American history in Cleveland
Negro league baseball teams
Giants
Defunct baseball teams in Ohio
Baseball teams disestablished in 1933
Baseball teams established in 1933